Delta Kappa Epsilon Fraternity House is a historic Delta Kappa Epsilon fraternity house located at Greencastle, Putnam County, Indiana. It was designed by noted Indiana architect Robert Frost Daggett and built in 1926.  It is a three-story, seven bay, Tudor Revival style building faced in Indiana limestone.  The building was originally "H"-shaped, but has been enlarged.  It has a hipped roof and three-bay protruding porch on the first floor.

It was listed on the National Register of Historic Places in 1996. It is located in the Eastern Enlargement Historic District.

References

DePauw University
Residential buildings on the National Register of Historic Places in Indiana
Tudor Revival architecture in Indiana
Houses completed in 1926
Buildings and structures in Putnam County, Indiana
National Register of Historic Places in Putnam County, Indiana
Historic district contributing properties in Indiana
Fraternity and sorority houses
Delta Kappa Epsilon